There have been two baronetcies created for persons with the surname Blount (pronounced "Blunt"), both in the Baronetage of England. Both creations are extinct.

 Blount baronets of Sodington (1642)
 Blount baronets of Tittenhanger (1680)

Set index articles on titles of nobility